020 is the dialing code for London, United Kingdom

020 may also mean:

 the Nairobi area code, for telephone numbers in Kenya
 the Amsterdam area code, for telephone numbers in the Netherlands
 the Guangzhou area code, for telephone numbers in China
 the Pune area code, for telephone numbers in India
 the Motorola 68020 processor